Disownment occurs when a parent renounces or no longer accepts a child as a family member, usually due to actions perceived as reprehensible, leading to serious emotional consequences. Different from giving a child up for adoption, it is a social and interpersonal act and usually takes place later in the child's life, which means that the disowned child would have to make their own arrangements for future care. Among other things, it implies no responsibility for future care, making it similar to divorce or repudiation (of a spouse), meaning that the disowned child would have to find another residence to call home and be cared for.

Disownment may entail disinheritance, familial exile, or shunning, and often all three. A disowned child might no longer be welcome in their former family's home or be allowed to attend major family events, or be allowed to know about such events taking place on social media.

Disownment is often taboo. In many countries, it is a form of child abandonment and is illegal when the child is a minor. 

In rare cases, a society and its institutions will accept an act of disownment.  For example, the British politician Leo Amery had two adult sons, both young adults at the time of World War II; one fought in the British forces, while the other, John Amery, cast his lot with Nazi Germany and beamed propaganda radio broadcasts to his homeland.  After the end of the war in 1945, young Amery was tried and executed for treason, whereupon the bereaved father asked, and received, permission from the editors of Who's Who to change the terms of his authorized biography from two sons to "one son".

See also 
Family estrangement

References

Family
Family law
Fatherhood
Inheritance
Kinship and descent
Motherhood
Shunning